"Will It Be Love by Morning" is a song written by Lewis Anderson and Fred Koller, and recorded by American country music artist Michael Martin Murphey.  It was released in January 1984 as the second single from the album The Heart Never Lies.  The song peaked at number 7 on the U.S. Billboard Hot Country Singles and at number 5 on the Canadian RPM Country Tracks chart.

Chart performance

References

1984 singles
Michael Martin Murphey songs
Songs written by Fred Koller
Song recordings produced by Jim Ed Norman
Liberty Records singles
Songs written by Lewis Anderson
1983 songs